Below is a list of notable footballers who have played for Al Sadd SC. Generally, this means players that have played 100 or more league matches for the club. However, some players who have played fewer matches are also included; this includes players that have had considerable success either at other clubs or at international level, as well as players who are well remembered by the supporters for particular reasons.

Players are listed in alphabetical order according to the date of their first-team official debut for the club. Appearances and goals are for first-team competitive matches only. Substitute appearances included. Statistics accurate as of 7 May 2021.

List of Al Sadd SC players

Nationalities are indicated by the corresponding FIFA country code.

List of All-time appearances
This List of All-time appearances for Al Sadd SC contains football players who have played for Al Sadd SC and have managed to accrue 100 or more appearances.

Bold Still playing competitive football in Al Sadd SC.

1 Includes the Qatar Cup and Sheikh Jassim Cup.
2 Includes the Cup Winners' Cup, Champions League and FIFA Club World Cup.

Players from Al Sadd SC to Europe

Notes

References

Players
Association football player non-biographical articles
Lists of association football players by club